Maria Bueno and Darlene Hard were the defending champions, but did not compete.

Karen Hantze and Billie Jean Moffitt defeated Jan Lehane and Margaret Smith in the final, 6–3, 6–4 to win the ladies' doubles tennis title at the 1961 Wimbledon Championships.

Seeds

  Sandra Reynolds /  Renée Schuurman (quarterfinals)
  Ann Haydon /  Christine Truman (third round)
  Jan Lehane /  Margaret Smith (final)
  Sally Moore /  Lesley Turner (semifinals)

Draw

Finals

Top half

Section 1

Section 2

Bottom half

Section 3

Section 4

References

External links

Women's Doubles
Wimbledon Championship by year – Women's doubles
Wimbledon Championships
Wimbledon Championships